Brian Kennedy is an American college basketball coach and current head coach for the NJIT Highlanders men's basketball team.

Playing career
Kennedy grew up in Rumson, New Jersey and attended Christian Brothers Academy. In college, Kennedy his playing career with Princeton before transferring and completing his college career at Monmouth.

Coaching career
Upon graduation, Kennedy took over his family's basketball business, The Hoop Group, one of the largest instructional basketball camps in the United States. He stayed in that role until 1997 when he joined the staff at DePaul as an assistant until 2002. From 2002 to 2009, Kennedy left coaching and worked in the financial sector.

Kennedy returned to coaching in 2009 as an assistant at NJIT under Jim Engles, and upon Engles departure to Columbia, Kennedy was elevated to the head coach.

Personal life
Kennedy's uncle is Pat Kennedy the former head coach at Iona, Florida State, DePaul, Montana and Towson. Kennedy served as an assistant on his uncle's staff at DePaul.

Head coaching record

NCAA DI

References

Year of birth missing (living people)
Living people
American men's basketball coaches
American men's basketball players
Basketball coaches from New Jersey
Basketball players from New Jersey
Christian Brothers Academy (New Jersey) alumni
College men's basketball head coaches in the United States
DePaul Blue Demons men's basketball coaches
Monmouth Hawks men's basketball players
NJIT Highlanders men's basketball coaches
People from Rumson, New Jersey
Princeton Tigers men's basketball players
Sportspeople from Monmouth County, New Jersey